The Real Housewives of Dallas is an American reality television series that premiered April 11, 2016, on Bravo. The series fifth and final season chronicled the lives of six women in and around Dallas— Stephanie Hollman, Brandi Redmond, D'Andra Simmons, Kameron Westcott, Kary Brittingham, and Dr. Tiffany Moon —as they balanced their personal and business lives, along with their social circle.

Former cast members featured over the previous four seasons were: Cary Deuber (1-3), Tiffany Hendra (1), and LeeAnne Locken (1-4).

, 78 original episodes of The Real Housewives of Dallas have aired over five seasons.

Series overview

Episodes

Season 1 (2016)

Cary Deuber, Tiffany Hendra, Stephanie Hollman, LeeAnne Locken and Brandi Redmond are introduced as series regulars. Marie Reyes served in a recurring capacity.

Season 2 (2017)

Hendra departed as a series regular. D'Andra Simmons and Kameron Westcott joined the cast.

Season 3 (2018)

Season 4 (2019-20)

Deuber departed as a series regular, whilst serving in a recurring capacity. Kary Brittingham joined the cast.

Season 5 (2021)

Final Season. Locken departed as a series regular. Tiffany Moon joined the cast. Jennifer Davis Long served in a recurring capacity.

References

External links

 

The Real Housewives of Dallas
Real Housewives of Dallas
Lists of American reality television series episodes